Fernando Cuéllar Ávalos (August 27, 1945 – November 5, 2008) was a Peruvian football player.

Club career
He was a defender and mainly played in Universitario de Deportes in the 1970s.

International career
Cuéllar made nine appearances for the senior Peru national football team from 1971 to 1975.

Career as manager
Cuéllar was also a successful trainer, leading San Agustin (a very small club from Lima) to win the Peruvian Championship (called "Descentralizado"). He repeated that success with Universitario de Deportes in 1990.

Personal
Cuéllar died 5 November 2008 in Lima.

References

External links

1945 births
2008 deaths
People from Moquegua Region
Association football defenders
Peruvian footballers
Peru international footballers
Peruvian Primera División players
Club Universitario de Deportes footballers
León de Huánuco footballers
Peruvian football managers
León de Huánuco managers
Peru national football team managers
Club Universitario de Deportes managers
1987 Copa América managers
FBC Melgar managers
Universidad San Martín managers